Dastjerd (also Romanized as Dastgerd) is a village in Roshtkhar Rural District, in the Central District of Roshtkhar County, Razavi Khorasan Province, Iran. At the 2006 census, its population was 102, in 24 families.

References 

Populated places in Roshtkhar County